"Love In a Void" is a song by the English rock band Siouxsie and the Banshees, written by singer Siouxsie Sioux, bassist Steven Severin, drummer Kenny Morris and guitarist Peter Fenton. Originally included as the b-side to the 1979 single "Mittageisen" in West Germany, it was later released as a double A-side single in September of the same year. It was also included on the band's 1981 ten track UK Gold certified compilation album Once Upon a Time: The Singles. In 2006, the song was covered by metal band Darkthrone on the ep Too Old Too Cold in 2006. "Love in a Void" was also heavily sampled by rapper Akala in a version retitled "Love in my Eyes" on the album Freedom Lasso in 2007. The  Banshees' studio version of "Love in a Void" was featured on the soundtrack of the 2016 film 20th Century Women.

Siouxsie and the Banshees' biographer Brian Johns wrote that "Love in a Void" was "their old stage favourite" back in the late 1970s.

Composition and recording 
Early demos indicate that the band composed the song during the first half of 1977 with guitarist Peter Fenton in the line-up. 

When the band recorded their first John Peel session for BBC Radio 1 in late November 1977 in Maida Vale studio with Fenton's replacement John McKay, the first song aired was "Love in a Void". Biographer Brian Johns noted that "Kenny Morris' drums were given the Glitter Band treatment on "Love In a Void"". The Peel session recording was released in 1987 on 12-inch and then in 2006 on the compilation Voices on the Air: The Peel Sessions.

In June 1979, the band finally recorded the song in George Martin's plush AIR studios situated at Oxford Street in London for Polydor. It was released as a double A-side 7-inch single in the UK in September. It was produced by band's manager Nils Stevenson and Mike Stavrou, the latter had engineered for one of the group's major influences, T. Rex on Dandy in the Underworld which was the final studio album of Marc Bolan.

The Banshees had already recorded another song dating from the Fenton-era for Polydor, "Carcass" on their debut album The Scream.

Legacy
The band was filmed playing "Love in a Void" live in concert by director Derek Jarman, it featured in the 1978 film Jubilee. The song was credited in the end credits of the film which was later released on VHS and DVD.

When the band decided to release a compilation album in late 1981, they included a version of "Love in a Void" in a slightly different mix.
"Love in a Void" also featured in the boxset At the BBC.

The song was still popular among their audience many years after its initial release. When Rolling Stone reviewed a tour reunion concert in New York in 2002, journalist Robin Athman noted that one discontented attendee said upon exiting, "I can't believe they didn't play 'Love in a Void'." Stuart Braithwaite of Mogwai selected it among his essential punk favourites during a radioshow for ABC.

Personnel
Siouxsie Sioux – Vocals
Steven Severin – bass guitar
Kenny Morris - Drums
John McKay – lead guitar

Sources

References

Siouxsie and the Banshees songs
1979 songs